Etim Ekpo is a town and Local Government Area in Akwa Ibom State, Nigeria.

History 
Created from the former Abak division, Etim Ekpo is one of the Annang-speaking areas. The seat of the local government council is in Utu Etim Ekpo a community in a Etim Ekpo. The inhabitants of this town is estimated to be 108,418, according to 2006 population census. Etim Ekpo local government area is made up of four districts of seventy-four communities and villages. The people of this clime are predominantly subsistence farmer, traders and craftsmen. Natural resources in Etim Ekpo local government area are sharp sand, gravel, timber and oil-palm.
The people of Etim Ekpo are mainly farmers, but  the educated indigenes work as civil servants within and outside the local government area. In the area of education, there are many public and private secondary schools. The local government area is the home of one private university, the Obong university, located at Obong Ntak. The people of etim ekpo are vast in knowledge and every other creative activity.

Geography 
Etim Ekpo LGA observes two seasons which are the dry and the blustery seasons. The normal temperature of the area is 25 °C while the normal stickiness of the area is put at 88%. The normal absolute precipitation recorded in Etim Ekpo LGA is 3250 mm per year.

Economy 
Etim Ekpo LGA has significantly a lot of raw petroleum and flammable gas stores. Fishing is additionally a significant monetary movement nearby with the few streams and feeders in the areas being wealthy in fish. Other significant occupations of individuals of Etim Ekpo LGA incorporate kayak making, cultivating, and exchange.

List of towns and villages in Etim Ekpo LGA

Uruk District 

 Atan
 Atuai
 Ete Edet
 Ikot Akasor
 Ikot Akpan Odomo
 Ikot Ikpa
 Ikot Inyang
 Ikot Inyang Ekpo
 Ikot Obio Nta
 Ikot Udo Etor
 Ntak Inyang
 Uruk Ata Ikot
 Uruk Ata Ikot Ebo
 Uruk Ata Ikot Ekpor
 Uruk Ata Ikot Isemin
 Uruk Ata Ikot Otok
 Uruk Ata Ikot Udedia
 Uruk Ata Ikot-Akpankpan
 Uruk Ata Nsidung

Ikono District 

 Ikot Akpa Nsek
 Ikot Akpakpan
 Ikot Edek
 Ikot Iya
 Ikot Obio Ema
 Ikot Odong
 Ikot Udo Nta
 Ikpe Atai
 Ikpe-Ikot-Akwa
 Inen Ikot Okpo
 Nto Edet
 Nto Unang
 Nung Oko Ikot
 Nwot Ikono

Utu Etim District 

 Ekwet Ikot Ebo
 Etek Utu Ikot Eboro
 Ikot Akpan
 Ikot Mboho
 Ikot Nkim
 Nto Obo
 Uruk Ata Ikot Akpan
 Uruk Eshiet
 Utu Etim Ekpo
 Utu Idung Akpan Udom
 Utu Ikot Ekpo
 Utu Ikot Imonte
 Utu Ikot Nkor
 Utu Nsekhe

Obong District 

 Abak Obong
 Abat Town
 Esa Obong
 Ibio Edem Urua
 Ibio Nung Achat
 Ibio Nung Iba
 Ikot Ama
 Ikot Awak
 Ikot Ese
 Ikot Esop
 Ikot Inung
 Ikot Iya
 Ikot Mkporikpo
 Ikot Obio Ama
 Ikot Udo Obong
 Ikot Umo Ebat
 Mkporikpo Utit-Idim
 Ndot Obong
 Obon Ebot
 Obong Ata Essien
 Obong Ikot Akpan
 Obong Ntak
 Obong Utit Idim
 Omum Unyam
 Otoro Obong
 Udianga Enem

References

Local Government Areas in Akwa Ibom State
Towns in Akwa Ibom State